Evonne Goolagong Cawley and Peggy Michel were the reigning champions. Michel did not defend her title. Goolagong Cawley competed alongside Helen Gourlay – this pair won the tournament.

Seeds

Draw

Finals

Top half

Bottom half

External links
 1976 Australian Open – Women's draws and results at the International Tennis Federation

Women's Doubles
Australian Open (tennis) by year – Women's doubles